Jytte Hilden (born 12 September 1942) is a Danish chemical engineer and politician (Social Democrats). She was elected member of the Folketing from 1979 to 1998, and was appointed Minister for Culture in Poul Nyrup Rasmussen's first Cabinet.

References

1942 births
Living people
People from Copenhagen
Social Democrats (Denmark) politicians
20th-century Danish politicians
20th-century Danish women politicians
Women government ministers of Denmark
Danish Culture Ministers
Danish Ministers of Higher Education and Science